Preston Jones (born July 3, 1970) is a former American football quarterback who played two seasons in the Canadian Football League with the Las Vegas Posse and Shreveport Pirates. He played college football at the University of Georgia and attended T. L. Hanna High School in Anderson, South Carolina. He was also a member of the Philadelphia Eagles, Atlanta Falcons and London Monarchs.

References

External links
Just Sports Stats
College stats

Living people
1970 births
Players of American football from South Carolina
American football quarterbacks
Georgia Bulldogs football players
Las Vegas Posse players
Shreveport Pirates players
London Monarchs players
People from Anderson, South Carolina